The São Tomé shorttail (Motacilla bocagii), also known as Bocage's longbill, is a species of passerine bird in the family Motacillidae. It has been classified as the sole member of the genus Amaurocichla, but a 2015 phylogenetic study placed it among the wagtails in the genus Motacilla. It is endemic to the central and southern parts of the island of São Tomé. Its natural habitat is subtropical or tropical moist lowland forests. This species has a small population and is threatened by habitat loss.

References

 
 
 

Motacilla
Birds described in 1892
Endemic birds of São Tomé and Príncipe
Endemic fauna of São Tomé Island
Taxonomy articles created by Polbot
Taxobox binomials not recognized by IUCN